Yamaska is a municipality in the Pierre-De Saurel Regional County Municipality, in the Montérégie region of Quebec. The population as of the Canada 2011 Census was 1,644.

Demographics

Population
Population trend:

(+) Amalgamation of Parish of Saint-Michel-d'Yamaska and the Villages of Yamaska and Yamaska-Est.

Language
Mother tongue language (2006)

See also
List of municipalities in Quebec

References

External links

Municipalities in Quebec
Incorporated places in Pierre-De Saurel Regional County Municipality
Quebec populated places on the Saint Lawrence River
Designated places in Quebec